Pascal Island in the Antarctic is a small rocky island  east-southeast of Descartes Island and  northeast of Cape Mousse. Charted in 1951 by the French Antarctic Expedition and named by them for Blaise Pascal (1623–1662), French physician and philosopher.

See also 
 List of Antarctic and sub-Antarctic islands

Islands of Adélie Land